Charles Manyuchi (born 19 November 1989) is a Zimbabwean professional boxer who briefly held the WBC Silver welterweight title.

Manyuchi made his professional debut in 2009, and won the ABU welterweight title in 2013. In 2014, he won the WBC International welterweight title against Patrick Allotey. He successfully defended his WBC crown in Lusaka against Devis Caceres. He was awarded the Zimbabwe's Sports Person of the Year accolade in 2014. He made another successful defense of the WBC International belt against Gianluca Frezza, in the latter's native Italy.

Manyuchi further advanced his career by beating Dmitry Mikhailenko in Yekaterinburg for the WBC Silver title. Manyuchi won the fight by unanimous decision (118-110, 116–114, 115–113). Manyuchi's run of 17 consecutive victories came to an end against Kudratillo Abdukakhorov. Abdukakhorov proved to be too much for Manyuchi, beating him with a first round technical knockout (TKO) after dropping him twice. Manyuchi mocked Abduqaxorov prior to the fight, saying that he was "in a different league" while his manager claimed they were already planning to fight for the WBC world title. Abdukakhorov claimed Manyuchi was "overconfident".

Manyuchi has since gone into the middleweight division and he is the current WBF Middleweight Champion after knocking out Argentina's Diego Gallardo in Harare.

Charles is the first world champion from Zimbabwe.

References

External links
 
 Charles Manyuchi Website

Living people
1989 births
Zimbabwean male boxers
Welterweight boxers
Middleweight boxers
African Boxing Union champions
World Boxing Council champions
Shona people
Sportspeople from Bulawayo